The Brook can refer to:

The Brook, a gentlemen's club in New York City
The Brook, Nelson, a suburb of Nelson, New Zealand
The Brook, a nickname for Carisbrook, a former sports venue in Dunedin, New Zealand
The Brook, formerly Seabrook Greyhound Park, a casino in Seabrook, New Hampshire

See also
Brook (disambiguation)